Phthalic anhydride is the organic compound with the formula C6H4(CO)2O. It is the anhydride of phthalic acid. Phthalic anhydride is a principal commercial form of phthalic acid. It was the first anhydride of a dicarboxylic acid to be used commercially. This white solid is an important industrial chemical, especially for the large-scale production of plasticizers for plastics. In 2000, the worldwide production volume was estimated to be about 3 million tonnes per year.

Synthesis and production
Phthalic anhydride was first reported in 1836 by Auguste Laurent. Early procedures involved liquid-phase mercury-catalyzed oxidation of naphthalene. The modern industrial variant process instead uses vanadium pentoxide (V2O5) as the catalyst in a gas-phase reaction with naphthalene using molecular oxygen. The overall process involves oxidative cleavage of one of the rings and loss of two of the carbon atoms as carbon dioxide.

An alternative process involves oxidation of the two methyl groups of o-xylene, a more atom-economical process. This reaction is run at about 320–400 °C and has the following stoichiometry:
C6H4(CH3)2  +  3 O2  →  C6H4(CO)2O + 3 H2O
The reaction proceeds with about 70% selectivity. About 10% of maleic anhydride is also produced: 
C6H4(CH3)2  +   O2  →  C4H2O3 + 4 H2O + 4 CO2
Phthalic anhydride and maleic anhydride are recovered by distillation by a series of switch condensers.

The naphthalene route (the Gibbs phthalic anhydride process or the Gibbs–Wohl naphthalene oxidation reaction) has declined relative to the o-xylene route.

Phthalic anhydride can also be prepared from phthalic acid by simple thermal dehydration above 210°C.

Uses

Phthalate esters plasticizers
The primary use of phthalic anhydride is a precursor to phthalate esters, used as plasticizers in vinyl chloride. Phthalate esters are derived from phthalic anhydride by the alcoholysis reaction. In the 1980s, approximately 6.5 million tonnes of these esters were produced annually, and the scale of production was increasing each year, all from phthalic anhydride. The process begins with the reaction of phthalic anhydride with alcohols, giving the monoesters:
C6H4(CO)2O  +  ROH  →  C6H4(CO2H)CO2R
The second esterification is more difficult and requires removal of water:
C6H4(CO2H)CO2R  +  ROH    C6H4(CO2R)2  +  H2O
The most important diester is bis(2-ethylhexyl) phthalate ("DEHP"), used in the manufacture of polyvinyl chloride compounds.

Precursor to dyestuffs

Phthalic anhydride is widely used in industry for the production of certain dyes. A well-known application of this reactivity is the preparation of the anthroquinone dye quinizarin by reaction with para-chlorophenol followed by hydrolysis of the chloride. Phenolphthalein can be synthesized by the condensation of phthalic anhydride with two equivalents of phenol under acidic conditions (hence the name). It was discovered in 1871 by Adolf von Baeyer.

Pharmaceuticals
Phthalic anhydride treated with cellulose acetate gives cellulose acetate phthalate (CAP), a common enteric coating excipient that has also been shown to have antiviral activity. Phthalic anhydride is a degradation product of CAP.

Reactions
Phthalic anhydride is a versatile intermediate in organic chemistry, in part because it is bifunctional and cheaply available.

Hydrolysis, alcoholysis, ammonolysis
Hydrolysis by hot water forms ortho-phthalic acid:
C6H4(CO)2O  +  H2O  →  C6H4(CO2H)2
Hydrolysis of anhydrides is not typically a reversible process. Phthalic acid is however easily dehydrated to form phthalic anhydride. Above 180 °C, phthalic anhydride re-forms.

Chiral alcohols form half-esters (see above), and these derivatives are often resolvable because they form diastereomeric salts with chiral amines such as brucine. A related ring-opening reaction involves peroxides to give the useful peroxy acid:
C6H4(CO)2O + H2O2 → C6H4(CO3H)CO2H
Phthalimide can be prepared by heating phthalic anhydride with aqueous ammonia giving a 95–97% yield. Alternatively, it may be prepared by treating the anhydride with ammonium carbonate or urea. It can also be produced by ammoxidation of o-xylene. Potassium phthalimide is commercially available and is the potassium salt of phthalimide. It may be prepared by adding a hot solution of phthalimide to a solution of potassium hydroxide; the desired product precipitates.

Preparation of aliphatic nitroalkenes
Phthalic anhydride is used to dehydrate short-chain nitro-alcohols to yield nitroalkenes, compounds with a high tendency to polymerize.

Safety
The most probable human exposure to phthalic anhydride is through skin contact or inhalation during manufacture or use. Studies show that exposure to phthalic anhydride can cause rhinitis, chronic bronchitis, and asthma. Phthalic anhydride's reaction on human health is generally an asthma–rhinitis–conjunctivitis syndrome or a delayed reaction and influenza-like symptoms and with increased immunoglobulin (E and G) levels in the blood.

References

External links
International Chemical Safety Card 0315
NIOSH Pocket Guide to Chemical Hazards

Carboxylic anhydrides
Phthalides
Commodity chemicals